The 1999 Nigerian Senate election in Delta State was held on February 20, 1999, to elect members of the Nigerian Senate to represent Delta State. Patrick Osakwe representing Delta North, Fred Aghogho Brume representing Delta Central and Stella Omu representing Delta South all won on the platform of the Peoples Democratic Party.

Overview

Summary

Results

Delta North 
The election was won by Patrick Osakwe of the Peoples Democratic Party.

Delta Central 
The election was won by Fred Aghogho Brume of the Peoples Democratic Party.

Delta South 
The election was won by Stella Omu of the Peoples Democratic Party.

References 

Del
Del
Delta State Senate elections